Sergey Anatolyevich Drobotenko (born 14 September 1969 in Dnipropetrovsk) is a Russian humorist.

Biography 
Drobotenko was born on 14 September 1969 in Dnipropetrovsk, Ukrainian SSR. At the age of three he moved with his parents to Omsk. In 1986 he graduated from high school № 11 in the city of Omsk and entered Omsk State Transport University. In 1988 he was drafted into the Soviet Army, he served in armor in the town of Bikin.

In 1992 he graduated from the Omsk Institute of Railway Engineers. In parallel, he graduated from the school of acting studio in actor. After the distribution of teaching electrical engineering at the railway lyceum the city of Omsk. In late 1993, he was adopted by a DJ on the radio Europa Plus in Omsk. In the same year Sergey Anatolyevich organizes theater pop miniatures.

In 1998, he moved from Omsk to Moscow, will debut at capital stage. Later becoming a screenwriter on the channel TV Tsentr.

In 1999 he became the winner of the (third) of the International competition of satire and humor of artists in Moscow. In 2005, the two spent a benefit evening And laughter, and sin in the concert hall Russia. Since 2005 —   participant and presenter of the festival of satire and humor in Jurmala.

Sergey Drobotenko is not married and has no children.

References

External links
 Official website
  Сергей Дроботенко: «Сцена лечит не только артистов!» (Интервью газете «Моё здоровье», ФРГ)

1969 births
Living people
People from Dnipro
Russian male comedians
Russian dramatists and playwrights
Russian television presenters
Russian radio personalities
Russian humorists